Aoraia lenis is a species of moth of the family Hepialidae. It is endemic to New Zealand. It was described by John S. Dugdale in 1994.

The wingspan is 62–73 mm for males. Female are brachypterous. Adults are on wing from February to May.

References

External links

Image of the holotype specimen held at Museum of New Zealand Te Papa Tongarewa
Citizen science observations

Moths described in 1994
Hepialidae
Moths of New Zealand
Endemic fauna of New Zealand
Endemic moths of New Zealand